Tika & the Dissidents is an Indonesian band whose music includes elements from jazz, blues, tango, waltz to punk.

History
Jakarta-born singer Kartika Jahja first released her own solo album titled Frozen Love Songs (2005) and Defrosted Love Songs (2006) under Aksara Records. She then recruited Luky Annash (piano), Susan Agiwitanto (bass), Okky Rahman Oktavian (drums), and Panji Gustiano (guitar) to be her back-up band. Along the line, the band became a significant part in the song-writing process.
 
In 2009, they first declared themselves as Tika and the Dissidents in the original soundtrack album of Joko Anwar’s film Pintu Terlarang. In the same year, the band parted ways with guitar player Panji Gustiano. A few months later they welcomed Iga Massardi as the newest member of the Dissidents.
 
After a two-year recording process, Tika and the Dissidents’ full-length album the Headless Songstress was released in July 2009 under the Head Records, a record label owned by the band. 
 
Much to the band’s surprise, the Headless Songstress received numerous praises from music fans and the media, both national and international. Tika and the Dissidents is said to be a breath of fresh air in the country’s homogenous music industry. The pinnacle of the year was when TEMPO magazine awarded the album as "Album of the Year 2009" and the band as "2009’s Chosen Music Figure".

Discography

Albums
 The Headless Songstress (2009)

Soundtracks
 Pintu Terlarang – “Home Safe” (Original Soundtrack – Lifelike Records, 2009)

Personnel
 Kartika Jahja - Vocals
 Susan Agiwitanto - Bass
 Iga Massardi - Guitar
 Jonathan Palempung - Keyboard
 Hertri Nur Pamungkas - Drums

See also
 List of Indonesian musicians

References 

Lose your head with Tika and The Dissidents .Jakarta Post. 2009-07-25.Tika and The Dissidents Melepas Bidadari Tanpa Kepala .Rolling Stone Indonesia. 2009-07-30.Tika & The Dissidents Angkat Pol Pot ke Lagu .Kompas. 2009-07-30.Singer Loses Her Head For Music .Jakarta Globe. 2009-08-19.Burn, Baby, Burn .Time Magazine Asia. 2005-11-30.Lima Album Indonesia Terbaik 2009 .Jakartabeat.net. 2009-12-19.

External links
 Suaratika
 TIKA and The Dissidents Myspace
 Journal TIKA and The Disidents

Indonesian jazz music groups